The Martial Mountains are a mountain range in Isla Grande de Tierra del Fuego, an island of Argentina and Chile. The mountain range is located east of Cordillera Darwin, just north of Ushuaia city in Argentina, along the Beagle Channel strait.

See also
Dientes del Navarino
Marinelli Glacier

Mountain ranges of Argentina
Landforms of Tierra del Fuego Province, Argentina
Isla Grande de Tierra del Fuego